Jetlag Dreams is an album by Departure Lounge released on September 11, 2001.  An all-instrumental album, recorded in Nashville, Tennessee, it was the second to be released by the group, and their first to be issued on Bella Union Records.

Track listing
"Equestrian Skydiving"
"Runway Doubts"
"Too Late to Die Young"
"A Strange Descent"
"Purple Fluffy Haze"
"Charles de Gaulle to Belleville"
"Beyond the Beltway"

Departure Lounge (band) albums
2001 albums
Instrumental rock albums
Bella Union albums